Aq Tash is mountain, 7,016 m, in the Rimo Muztagh, part of the Karakorum.

Location and features 
The Aq Tash lies in India near its disputed border with Pakistan. A mountain arête runs northwest from Aq Tash to Mamostong Kangri, 8.97 km away.

Climbing history 
The Aq Tash was first ascended on 6 August 1993 by Nobuo Yamamoto and Yasufumi Mizote, members of a Japanese expedition.

Two days later they were followed to the summit by Prem Singh, P.T. Sherpa, Mohan Singh, Khem Raj, Sange Sherpa, Wangchuk Sherpa and Hira Ram, members of an Indian expedition.

References

External links 
 

Mountains of Ladakh
Seven-thousanders of the Karakoram